The 2023 IHF Men's Junior World Championship will be the 24th edition of the IHF Men's Junior World Championship, and will be held in Germany and Greece under the aegis of the International Handball Federation (IHF) from 20 June to 2 July 2023. It will be the second time in history that the championship will be jointly organised by two countries, the first being in 1979.

Bidding process
Two nations entered bid for hosting the tournament:
 
 

Croatia later withdrew their bid. The tournament was awarded to Germany by IHF Council in its meeting held in Cairo, Egypt on 28 February 2020.

In May/June 2021, the Hellenic Handball Federation approached to German Handball Association with request to co-host the 2023 Men's Junior World Handball Championship due to the cancellation of the 2021 Men's Youth World Handball Championship, which was supposed to be hosted by Greece. On 15 July 2021, the IHF Council unanimously approved the request from Germany and Greece to co-host the event.

Qualification

Draw
The draw took place on 17 January 2023 in Katowice.

Preliminary round
Times in Germany are UTC+2, in Greece UTC+3.

Group A

Group B

Group C

Group D

Group E

Group F

Group G

Group H

President's Cup
Points obtained in the matches against the team from the group are taken over.

Group I

Group II

Group III

Group IV

Main round
Points obtained in the matches against the team from the group are taken over.

Group I

Group II

Group III

Group IV

Classification games

25th–32nd places

17–24th places

9–16th places

Knockout stage

Bracket
Championship bracket

5–8th place bracket

Quarterfinals

5–8th place semifinals

Semifinals

Seventh place game

Fifth place game

Third place game

Final

Final ranking

Notes

References

External links
Official website
IHF website

2023 Men's Junior World Handball Championship
2023 Men's Junior World Handball Championship
Men's Junior World Handball Championship
Men's Junior World Handball Championship
2023
Junior World Handball Championship
Men's Junior World Handball Championship
Men's Junior World Handball Championship
World Men's Junior